"How Long" is the debut single by the English band Ace, from their 1974 debut album Five-A-Side. It reached No. 3 in the US and Canadian charts, and No. 20 on the UK Singles Chart.

In a 1981 issue of Smash Hits, Phil Collins named the song as one of his top 10 favourites, describing it as a "classic single".

Background
Although widely interpreted as being about adultery, the song was in fact composed by lead singer Paul Carrack upon discovering that bassist Terry ("Tex") Comer had been secretly working with the Sutherland Brothers and Quiver. The ‘friends with their fancy persuasions’ cited in the lyrics are said to be in reference to the Sutherland Brothers and Quiver's management.

The guitar solo is by lead guitarist Phil Harris. Alan 'Bam' King was the band's rhythm guitarist, formerly with the Action.

The band had originally tried to record the song as a "Motown"-type single for Anchor Records, but gave up in favour of recording their first album at Rockfield Studios in Wales. The song was recorded for the album.

Personnel
Phil Harris - lead guitar, vocals
Alan "Bam" King - rhythm guitar, vocals
Paul Carrack - organ, vocals, piano, electric piano
Terry "Tex" Comer - bass
Fran Byrne - drums, percussion

Chart history

Weekly charts

Year-end charts

Cover versions
Australian band Scandal charted in the top 50 of the Kent Music Report with their version. It is from their only album release Scandal (1978).
Lipps Inc., in 1980, hit No. 4 on the U.S. dance chart, No. 29 on the U.S. soul singles chart, No. 42 in Canada (2 weeks), and No. 44 in Australia. A sample of their cover was later used in Cypis's 2015 single "Gdzie jest biały węgorz". "How Long" was used in a popular Internet meme in 2020 of a computer-generated cow dancing, known as "Polish Cow".
Rod Stewart, in 1981, charted in the top 50 of the UK Singles Chart and US Billboard Hot 100 and No. 26 in Ireland. It was included on his album Tonight I'm Yours. 
In 1993, British reggae group Aswad and singer Yazz reached No. 31 on the UK Singles Chart, with their take from Yazz's 1994 album One on One.
Composer and original vocalist Paul Carrack recorded a solo version for his 1995 album Blue Views.  It hit No. 32 on the UK chart.

See also
List of 1970s one-hit wonders in the United States

References

External links
 
 
 

1974 songs
1974 debut singles
1977 singles
1981 singles
Ace (band) songs
Aswad (band) songs
Barbara Mandrell songs
Lipps Inc. songs
Paul Carrack songs
Rod Stewart songs
Yazz songs
Anchor Records singles
Songs written by Paul Carrack
Cashbox number-one singles
Songs about infidelity